Shujauddin or Shuja-ud-Din may refer to:

 Feer Khan Shujauddin (died 1657), Ismāʿīli leader, 33rd Da'i al Mutlaq of the Dawoodi Bohra sect.
 Malik ul Ashtar Shujauddin (born 1948), son of 52nd Da'i al-Mutlaq, Mohammed Burhanuddin.
 Shujauddin (cricketer, 1919–2003), Indian cricketer for Delhi and Pakistani Test cricket umpire
 Shujauddin (cricketer, 1930–2006), Pakistani Test cricketer
 Shujauddin (cricketer, born 1936), Pakistani cricketer for Punjab A and Water and Power Development Authority
 Shujauddin (cricketer, born 1970), Pakistani cricketer for Quetta
 Shuja-ud-Din Muhammad Khan (1670–1740), Nawab of Bengal, Bihar, and Orissa
 Shujauddin Malik (born 1972), Pakistani weightlifter
 Shujauddin Shaikh (born 1974), Emir of Tanzeem-e-Islami

Arabic masculine given names